Prionella beauvoisii is a species of ulidiid or picture-winged fly in the genus Prionella of the family Ulidiidae.

References

Ulidiidae